The Gopher Count is an annual community festival held in Viola, Minnesota, United States. Since 1874, the event has been on the third Thursday in June.  Some the events include a parade, a tractor show, a nail-driving contest (women only), a pie-eating contest, fireworks, and dancing. Gopher Count is one year older than the Kentucky Derby.

The festival is named for the practice of collecting a bounty on killed gophers, still paid by the township , though other aspects of the festival are more actively promoted.

References

External links
Viola Gopher Count website
Explore Minnesota: Gopher Count

Festivals in Minnesota
Tourist attractions in Olmsted County, Minnesota